Veronica Clarke (May 17, 1912 - July 27, 1999) was a Canadian figure skater who competed in single skating, pair skating, and four skating. She competed in pairs with Ralph McCreath, winning the North American title in 1937, and three national titles in 1936-1938. In fours, she was the 1938 national fours champion with Constance Wilson-Samuel, Montgomery Wilson, and Ralph McCreath.

Results

Singles career

Pairs career
(with Ralph McCreath)

Fours career
(with Constance Wilson-Samuel, Montgomery Wilson, and Ralph McCreath)

References

 North American Championships info

Canadian female pair skaters
Canadian female single skaters
1912 births
1999 deaths